Kwara United Football Club is a Nigerian football club based in Ilorin. They play in the top division in Nigerian football, the Nigeria Professional football League after promotion in 2017 from the Nigeria National League. Their home stadium is the Kwara State Stadium.

History
The club's roots go back to the Kwara Water Corporation Football Club in 1974. It was supposed to be an in-house club for the staffers of the Water Corporation. Due to the results and depth of talents in the club, the scope was opened and by 1979 qualified to play in the National League second division alongside the First Bank F.C. of Lagos. That same year, the club got to the quarter-final stage of the Football Association Cup (otherwise called the Challenge Cup) where she lost to Bendel Insurance football club of Benin 2–1.  In 1985, due to the change in the name of the parent corporation to Kwara Utility Board, the club changed its name to Kwara Utility Bombers of Ilorin. It was relegated to division three at the end of that season. With the disengagement of the parent corporation from financing the team in 1990, the club adjusted its name to Kwara Bombers football club of Ilorin. It suffered financial stress, which culminated in her relegation to division three in 1996. The new state government led by Colonel Peter Asum Ogar led the purchase in March 1997 of the Exide Club of Ibadan, moved them to Ilorin and took their slot in the Second Division. Ogar christened the new outfit Kwara United Football Club of Ilorin.

The club came third at the end of the 2006 Super Four play-off behind Ocean Boys and Nasarawa United FC and qualified for the 2007 edition of the CAF Confederation Cup.

The coaching staff for the 2006–07 season included Swedes Roger Palmgren and Johan Eriksson (son of former England and Mexico manager, Sven-Göran Eriksson). The team was coached by former players of the team: Toyin Ayinla, Tunde Sanni and Aliyu Muzambilu (Goalkeeper trainer) following the passing of Technical Adviser Kafaru Alabi on January 8, 2008. However, they were relegated from the Premier League on the last day of the 2007/08 season on goal differential. They regained promotion back to the top level the next year as Champions of Division 1-A.
The team appointed an Investment Consultant, Goldenwing33 Nigeria Limited, headed by former Nigerian international and former deputy editor (Sports) of Thisday newspaper, Olajide Ayodeji Fashikun. The Investment Consultant is to organise the privatisation and private sector participation in the club's funding in two years.
The fans of the club have one of the worst reputations in Nigeria, as witnessed during a vicious beating of the referees after a 0–0 tie in 2008.
Kwara played some of the 2010/11 season in Offa and Abeokuta as the ground was renovated.
After relegation in 2013 they won promotion back in 2014. After their last game with Ranchers Bees was abandoned in Kaduna with 28 minutes to play tied at 2–2, they played again at a neutral site with Kwara needing the win and three points to leapfrog Ranchers for promotion. The replay was again abandoned when Bees' players attacked the referee and team staff encroached the field. The League ruled Bees at fault, fined the club and awarded the win to Kwara United, thus securing the promotion.

Farm club
The club is owner of Kwara United Feeders Team of Ilorin.

Club names

1974–85: Kwara Water Corporation football club
1985–90: Kwara Utility Bombers of Ilorin
1990–97: Kwara Bombers Football Club of Ilorin
1997–: Kwara United Football Club of Ilorin

Achievements
Nigerian Premier League: 1
2006 Regular Season champions, 3rd in Super Four Play-off

National Second Division: 1
1997

Performance in CAF competitions
CAF Confederation Cup: 1 appearance
2007 – Group stage

CAF Cup: 1 appearance
1999 – Quarter-finals

Current squad
As of 1 January 2021

Former coaches
 Kafaru Alabi
 Toyin Ayinla
 Johann Eriksson
 Kosta Papić
 Roger Palmgren (2006–07)
 Kadiri Ikhana (1997), (2010–11)
 Tunde Sanni (2011–12)
 Samson Unuanel (2012–13), (2013–14)
 Babatunde Abdulrahmon (2014–2015)
 John Sam Obuh (2015–2017)
 Abubakar Bala (2017–2019)

Notes

 
Football clubs in Nigeria
Kwara State
Association football clubs established in 1997
1997 establishments in Nigeria
Sports clubs in Nigeria